Wasuderao Dattatraya Sane (14 January 1914 – 25 February 1991) played 17 matches of first-class cricket for several teams in India from 1937 to 1959.

A left-arm medium-pace bowler and middle-order batsman, in 1947-48 Sane captained Central Provinces and Berar in their only Ranji Trophy victory; he took 4 for 20 and 3 for 35 in the 113-run victory over Mysore. In his only other match as captain he led Madhya Pradesh to an innings defeat against Holkar in 1953-54, taking 6 for 191 in Holkar's innings and top-scoring for Madhya Pradesh with 43 in the second innings.

He played in Vidarbha's debut match in the Ranji Trophy in 1957-58, taking 3 for 45 and 4 for 38 against Uttar Pradesh. A year later, a few days after his 45th birthday, he took his best figures of 6 for 60 for Vidarbha against Madhya Pradesh.

He was later an umpire. His elder brother Narayan was also a first-class cricketer and umpire.

References

External links

1914 births
1991 deaths
Indian cricketers
People from Amravati
Madhya Pradesh cricketers
South Zone cricketers
Vidarbha cricketers
Maharashtra cricketers
Indian cricket umpires